The Sri Lanka cricket team toured India from 30 October to 16 November 2014 for five One Day Internationals (ODIs) after the abandonment of the West Indies tour of India due to a pay dispute. India won the series 5–0 their fourth 5-0 whitewash in ODI history. It is also Sri Lanka's first 0-5 whitewash loss.

In the fourth ODI match, Indian batsman Rohit Sharma scored 264, setting a new record for the highest score in an ODI. He hit 33 fours in this inning which is also a world record.

Squads

Tour matches

List A: India A vs Sri Lanka

ODI series

1st ODI

The 1st ODI proved to be a rather one-sided affair. After a sedate start Indian openers opened up after the end of the 1st powerplay and after taking an early 2nd powerplay India scored 105 runs between overs 21–30. Both the openers got here 50's and 100's in the same overs and building on this foundations and a quickfire 50 by Raina India set a daunting target on 364 for Sri Lanka. Sri Lanka's openers also started cautiously but unlike Indian openers they couldn't build on and with loss of wickets at constant intervals India won by 169 runs. Ishant Sharma recorded his best ODI bowling performance. Varun Aaron had to leave the field during his fourth over due to muscle injury.

2nd ODI

The 2nd ODI was another one-sided affair. Sri Lanka lost Kusal Perera in the 1st over and despite some aggressive batting from Dilshan and Sangakkara India were still able to keep the innings under control. However, some late order hitting from Thisara Perera and an unbeaten 92 from captain Angelo Mathews took Sri Lanka to 274, which was the same score they scored in the 2011 Cricket World Cup Final. India lost Ajinkya Rahane early but two 100+ partnerships for the 2nd and 3rd wickets took India to victory. Ambati Rayudu scored his maiden international century.

3rd ODI

Sri Lanka started the innings poorly, losing Kusal Perera to Umesh Yadav again in the 1st over. A 105 run partnership between Mahela Jayawardene and Tillakaratne Dilshan revived Sri Lanka's innings. however, three-wickets in three overs by Axar Patel during the powerplay resulted in Sri Lanka losing all the momentum. Banking on a superb century from Jayawardene and a 50 from Dilshan Sri Lanka scored 242. India started positively in their reply and a fighting 79-ball 91 from Shikhar Dhawan laid the foundation for India's victory. During his innings of 53 Indian captain Virat Kohli became the fastest batsmen in terms of innings to reach 6000 career ODI runs. Yadav achieved his maiden 4-wicket haul in ODIs.

4th ODI

The fourth match of the series became a one-man show. Rohit Sharma, playing his first international match after fracturing his finger against England in August 2014, scored a record-breaking 264 off 173 balls, as India scored 404 in their allocated 50 overs. The innings involved a 202 run partnership for the 3rd wicket between Sharma and captain Virat Kohli, and a 128 run partnership for the 5th wicket between Sharma and Robin Uthappa, in which Uthappa contributed only 16. Sri Lanka lost their first 4 wickets for 48 runs. Fifties from captain Angelo Mathews and Lahiru Thirimanne only delayed the inevitable as India took a 4–0 lead in the series.

5th ODI

The start of the Sri Lankan innings followed the similar pattern from previous matches. They lost an opener early in their innings. However a 128 run partnership between captain Angelo Mathews and Lahiru Thirimanne lead to a recovery in the innings. Sri Lanka scored 73 runs in their last 5 overs and 114 runs in the last 10 as on the back of Mathews maiden ODI century Sri Lanka posted a competitive total.

References

External links
ESPNcricinfo series home

2014 in Indian cricket
Indian cricket seasons from 2000–01
International cricket competitions in 2014–15